Kesher Zion is a Conservative Jewish congregation in Reading, Pennsylvania. Congregations B'nai Zion and Kesher Israel merged to form Kesher Zion in 1929.

In April 1978, vandals painted seven swastikas on the walls, doors, and columns of the synagogue.

References

External links
 

1929 establishments in Pennsylvania
Conservative synagogues in Pennsylvania
Reading, Pennsylvania
Jewish organizations established in 1929
20th-century attacks on synagogues and Jewish communal organizations